Javier Bruses Manresa (born May 11, 1979 in Barcelona, Spain) is a field hockey goalkeeper from Spain, who was a member of the Men's National Team that finished fourth at the 2004 Summer Olympics in Athens, Greece. The goalie of Real Club de Polo won the title at the Champions Trophy tournament in Lahore (2004), and at the 2005 Men's Hockey European Nations Cup in Leipzig.

Currently playing in the third team of Real Club de Polo Barcelona as a striker, received the golden medal of Real Club de Polo Barcelona for his excellent hockey carrier representing his club.

External links
 
 Profile on Athens 2004-website

1979 births
Living people
Spanish male field hockey players
Male field hockey goalkeepers
Olympic field hockey players of Spain
2002 Men's Hockey World Cup players
Field hockey players at the 2004 Summer Olympics
Field hockey players from Barcelona
Real Club de Polo de Barcelona players